The Nairobi International Convention on the Removal of Wrecks is a 2007 treaty of the International Maritime Organization (IMO).

The purpose of the convention is to establish uniform rules for the prompt and effective removal of shipwrecks located in the exclusive economic zone (EEZ) of a state that may be hazardous to navigation or to the environment. The convention gives states authority to remove wrecks from the portion of its EEZ that is within international waters without any implication that the state is claiming sovereignty over that area.

The convention was concluded at Nairobi, Kenya, on 18 May 2007. It entered into force on 14 April 2015 after being ratified by ten states.

States parties 
As of November 2018, the Convention has been ratified by 41 states.

Notes

References

External links

Summary of the Convention, International Maritime Organization
Text of Convention, Government of the United Kingdom

2007 in Kenya
2007 in the environment
Environmental treaties
International Maritime Organization treaties
Treaties concluded in 2007
Treaties entered into force in 2015
Treaties of Albania
Treaties of Antigua and Barbuda
Treaties of the Bahamas
Treaties of Belgium
Treaties of Bulgaria
Treaties of the People's Republic of China
Treaties of the Comoros
Treaties of the Republic of the Congo
Treaties of the Cook Islands
Treaties of Croatia
Treaties of Cyprus
Treaties of Denmark
Treaties of Finland
Treaties of France
Treaties of Germany
Treaties of India
Treaties of Iran
Treaties of Jordan
Treaties of Kenya
Treaties of Liberia
Treaties of Malaysia
Treaties of Malta
Treaties of the Marshall Islands
Treaties of Morocco
Treaties of the Netherlands
Treaties of Nigeria
Treaties of Niue
Treaties of North Korea
Treaties of Palau
Treaties of Panama
Treaties of Portugal
Treaties of Romania
Treaties of Saint Kitts and Nevis
Treaties of Singapore
Treaties of South Africa
Treaties of Sweden
Treaties of Switzerland
Treaties of Tonga
Treaties of Tuvalu
Treaties of the United Kingdom
Treaties extended to Gibraltar
Treaties extended to the Isle of Man
Shipwreck law